Le Saulchoir is a Dominican school of theology in the order's province of France, established 1904.

After the expulsion from France in 1880, French Dominican friars went into exile in Spain and Austria; they were allowed to return in 1895, establishing themselves in the convent of Flavigny-sur-Ozerain.
After the renewed expulsion in 1903, the Dominicans were exiled to Belgium, residing at Kain (now a part of Tournai). 
Here, they established a   studium generale in 1904, in a former Cistercian abbey called Le Saulchoir. 
From there, they published two journals, Revue des Sciences philosophiques et théologiques (from 1907)
and the Bulletin thomiste (from 1924, not to be confused with Revue thomiste, a neo-Thomist journal established in 1893). 
In 1939, the Dominicans were allowed back into France and they established themselves in Étiolles (Essonne département), retaining the name of Le Saulchoir for their school. They remained in Étiolles until 1971, in which year they moved to the couvent Saint-Jacques in Paris where the Centre d'études du Saulchoir was established in 1992.

References

 Marie-Dominique Chenu, Le Saulchoir, une école de théologie (1937, 2nd ed. 1985).
 André Duval,   « Aux origines de l'Institut historique d'études thomistes du Saulchoir », Revue des Sciences philosophiques et théologiques, 1991.

External links
 centre-saulchoir.org
 centredusaulchoir.over-blog.com

Dominican Order
Thomism
Catholic universities and colleges in France